Ernest Douglas Black (date of birth unknown-1931; also credited as "Edmund D. Black") was a British tennis player active in the late 19th century and early 20th century.

Tennis career
Black reached the quarterfinals of the U.S. National Championships in 1900, losing to the only other competing British player, future three-time Wimbledon champion Arthur Gore. He competed in the very first edition of the Davis Cup (then known as the International Lawn Tennis Challenge) in 1900.

References

External links 

 
 

1931 deaths
Year of birth missing
Date of death missing
English male tennis players
British male tennis players